Not On Top is a 2005 album by Herman Düne.

On this record Herman Düne are augmented by Canadian singer-songwriter Julie Doiron, who plays bass and provides some of the vocals. This is Herman Düne's first record to make significant use of bass guitar. It was recorded at Hall Place Studios in Leeds, England. Unusually for an album of the 21st century it was deliberately recorded in mono.

Track listing
"Little Wounds" – 3:15
"Not On Top" – 3:32
"Had I Not Known" – 3:04 
"Walk, Don't Run" – 3:37
"Slow Century" – 3:15
"This Will Never Happen" – 3:51
"German Green" – 0:59
"Recording Farfisa" – 0:51
"You Could Be A Model, Goodbye" – 3:18
"Seven Cities" – 3:05
"Good For No One" – 4:07
"Orange Hat" – 3:01
"Whatever Burns The Best Baby" – 3:42
"Eleven Stones" – 3:07
"Warning Spectrum" – 1:18

Personnel
David-Ivar Herman Düne – vocals, Gibson & Levin guitars, ukulele, piano
André Herman Düne – vocals, Silvertone guitar, Simon & Patrick guitar, piano, lapsteel guitar
Neman – drums, percussion, saw, flute 
Julie Doiron – eko bass, vocals, ukulele 
Lisa Li-Lund – vocals 
Dave Tatersall – vocals, Gibson guitar, handclaps
Rachel MacWatt – vocals
Gill Iles – vocals
Alice Hubley – vocals

2005 albums
Albums produced by Richard Formby
Herman Dune albums